Aleksandr Shapiro (born January 1, 1969) is a Ukrainian director, writer and editor. His movies were part of the program of international film festivals in Berlin International Film Festival, Cannes Film Festival, etc.

Cinema 
Сiсuta, Ukraine, 2002

Guide, Ukraine, 2004

Happypeople, Ukraine, 2005

Casting, Ukraine, 2008

References

Sources
 Kinopoisk, about Aleksandr Shapiro 
 Kino-Teatr, about Aleksandr Shapiro 
 Jewish News, interview 
 KUT: "Послевкусие "Цикуты" Александра Шапиро…" 
 Interview 
 Alexander Shapiro: HappyPeople (2006) and Casting (2008)

External links 
 Aleksandr Shapiro on YouTube
 Tzadics
 

1969 births
Mass media people from Vladivostok
Ukrainian film directors
Living people
Ukrainian screenwriters
Ukrainian film editors